Musaid or  Imsaad is a town in Butnan District in eastern Libya. Alternates names include: Oistant, Msa'ed, Imsa'ed, and Musa'ed.

History
Musaid was the site of heavy fighting during the brief Libyan–Egyptian War of 1977. This war, the break-off of Libyan-Egyptian diplomatic relations, and the resultant trade embargo with Egypt, had a very negative impact on Musaid. For example, Musaid's population shrank from 4,330 in 1973 to 3,200 in 1984 (-26.1%), while overall Libya's population rose in the same period by 60.30%.

Culture
Nearby is the Sidi Shahir Ruhih shrine.

Economy
Musaid's economy depended heavily on trade between Egypt and Libya.  After the 1977 war and the follow-on trade embargo with Egypt, this was replaced in part by smuggling, aided by the close tribal ties across the border. In 2008, the Libyan government acted to suppress the smugglers.

Border crossing
As of autumn 2010, a large suite of new border facilities is under construction.

See also 
 List of cities in Libya

Notes

External links
 "Musa`id, Libya", Falling Rain Genomics, Inc. 
 Satellite map at Maplandia.com

Populated places in Butnan District
Egypt–Libya border crossings
Cyrenaica
Baladiyat of Libya